Tibor Taraš (born 24 September 1997) is a German basketball player who last played for Apollo Amsterdam of the BNXT League.

Professional career
In the 2020–21 season, Taras played for the RheinStars Köln. In the third-tier ProB league, he averaged a team-high 18.7 points per game.

On 3 August 2021, Taras signed with Apollo Amsterdam of the Dutch BNXT League. On 25 September, Taras hit a buzzer-beating game winner against The Hague Royals.

References

External links

1997 births
Living people
Apollo Amsterdam players
Baunach Young Pikes players
FC Schalke 04 Basketball players
German expatriate sportspeople in the Netherlands
German men's basketball players
German people of Hungarian descent
RheinStars Köln players
Small forwards
Sportspeople from Cologne